Watt Kam Sing (born 6 June 1967) is a Hong Kong breaststroke swimmer. He competed at the 1984 Summer Olympics and the 1988 Summer Olympics.

References

External links
 

1967 births
Living people
Hong Kong male breaststroke swimmers
Olympic swimmers of Hong Kong
Swimmers at the 1984 Summer Olympics
Swimmers at the 1988 Summer Olympics
Commonwealth Games competitors for Hong Kong
Swimmers at the 1982 Commonwealth Games
Place of birth missing (living people)
Swimmers at the 1982 Asian Games
Swimmers at the 1986 Asian Games
Asian Games competitors for Hong Kong